The Joint Interface Control Officer (JICO) is the senior multi-tactical data link interface control officer in support of joint task force operations. The JICO is responsible for effecting planning and management of the joint tactical data link network within a theater of operations.

Notes

References
 CJCSI 6240.01C
 CJCSM 3115.01A 
 [6120.01 (series) Joint Multi-TDL Operation Procedure (JMTOP)]
 [MIL-STD-6016 (series) Tactical Data Link (TDL) 16 Message Standard] 
 [STANAG 5516 Allied Tactical Data Link (TDL) 16 Message Standard] 

Information systems